Krivonosov (from кривой нос meaning crooked nose) is a Russian masculine surname, its feminine counterpart is Krivonosova. It may refer to

Elena Krivonosova (born 1972), Ukrainian volleyball player
Mikhail Krivonosov (1929–1995), Soviet hammer thrower
Oleg Krivonosov (born 1961), Latvian chess player
Sergey Krivonosov (born 1971), Russian politician

Russian-language surnames